Bernard Patrick Wall (15 March 1894 – 18 June 1976) was an English prelate who served in the Roman Catholic Church as the Bishop of Brentwood from 1955 to 1969.

Born in Tonbridge, Kent on 15 March 1894, he was ordained to the priesthood on 14 July 1918. He was appointed the Bishop of the Diocese of Brentwood by the Holy See on 30 November 1955. His consecration to the Episcopate took place on 18 January 1956, the principal consecrator was Cyril Conrad Cowderoy, Bishop (later Archbishop) of Southwark, and the principal co-consecrators were Neil Farren, Bishop of Derry and George Andrew Beck, Bishop of Salford (later Archbishop of Liverpool). Bishop Wall participated in all the four sessions of the Second Vatican Council, held between in 1962 and 1965.

He retired on 14 April 1969 and assumed the title Bishop Emeritus of Brentwood. He died on 18 June 1976, aged 82.

References

1894 births
1976 deaths
20th-century Roman Catholic bishops in England
Participants in the Second Vatican Council
People from Tonbridge
Roman Catholic bishops of Brentwood